Itak gurgur is a traditional Batak food that is generally eaten at a particular Batak customary event. It is made with the same ingredients as lampet, rice that has been traditionally milled, known as itak. It is made by kneading itak with shredded young coconut, sugar, and hot water. Once blended, the dough is molded by hand into the shape of a fist and steamed. The resulting taste is sweet and savory, similar to that of lampet.

The word "gurgur" here means "burning". Giving itak gurgur to someone signifies that the recipient has the spirit of a burning ember.

See also

 Sasagun
 Batak cuisine

References

External links
 Recipe

Batak cuisine